Murathan Mungan (born 21 April 1955 in Istanbul) is a Turkish author, short story writer, playwright, and poet.

Biography 
Mungan's family originates from Mardin. His father is an Arab and mother is a Bosniak. After receiving his BA from the Faculty of Letters and Drama at Ankara University, he worked as a dramaturg before devoting all his time to writing poetry, plays, short stories, novels, film scenarios, and songs. His first collection of poems, Osmanlıya Dair Hikayat (Stories about Ottomans) was published in 1980, making Mungan an overnight success.

His output remained prolific and various poetry books followed, notably Yaz Gecer (Summer Passes) and Metal. He has written four theatre plays, which earned him wider success. Mahmud ile Yezida, Taziye are two of the most staged plays of the modern Turkish theatre.

His short stories were compiled in successful volumes such as Kırk Oda (Forty Rooms) and  Paranın Cinleri (Genies of Money). His screenplay Dağınık Yatak (Messy Bed) was later filmed by director Atıf Yılmaz in 1986 starring Turkish actress Müjde Ar.

Mungan also wrote lyrics to some of Yeni Türkü's songs, and for pop singers such as Nükhet Duru.

In 2006, Murathan Mungan supervised the production of a music album by Turkish arabesk singer Müslüm Gürses, featuring cover versions of popular songs such as "Alexandra Leaving" by Leonard Cohen, "Mr. Tambourine Man" by Bob Dylan, and "I'm Deranged" by David Bowie, all of which were selected by Mungan.

Openly gay, Mungan has been often associated with the Turkish gay movement as a gay icon.

Discography
 Söz Vermiş Şarkılar (2004, tribute album)
 Aşk Tesadüfleri Sever (2006, supervisor)
 2020 Model (2020, tribute album)

References

External links
  Official Site
 Portrait of Murathan Mungan
 Murathan Mungan Biyografisi

1955 births
Writers from Istanbul
Ankara University alumni
Living people
Gay poets
Turkish gay writers
Turkish novelists
Turkish dramatists and playwrights
Turkish Arab people
Turkish LGBT poets
Turkish LGBT novelists
Turkish LGBT dramatists and playwrights
Turkish male writers
Gay novelists
Gay dramatists and playwrights
Turkish male short story writers
Turkish male poets
20th-century Turkish poets
20th-century novelists
20th-century dramatists and playwrights
21st-century Turkish poets
21st-century novelists
21st-century dramatists and playwrights
20th-century Turkish short story writers
21st-century short story writers
20th-century Turkish male writers
21st-century Turkish male writers